Summit Woods Crossing is an open air shopping center in Lee's Summit, Missouri which is located on US Hwy 50 at I-470. Summit Woods Crossing is across US 50 from Summit Fair. It opened in 2001.

Anchors
Super Target
Petco
Lowe's
T.J. Maxx
Dick's Sporting Goods
Michaels
Best Buy
Kohl's
Bed Bath & Beyond
Pier 1 Imports
Office Max
Old Navy

See also
Summit Fair

References
http://www.bizjournals.com/kansascity/stories/2010/06/21/story8.html

Lee's Summit, Missouri
Shopping malls in Missouri
Shopping malls established in 2001
Buildings and structures in Jackson County, Missouri
2001 establishments in Missouri